Allen Manvel (September 26, 1837 – 1893) was the eleventh president of the Atchison, Topeka and Santa Fe Railway.

Manvel was born in Alexander, New York.  In 1859 he began employment with the Chicago, Rock Island and Pacific Railroad as a clerk in the purchasing agent's office.  He worked his way up through the ranks to become the general superintendent.  His employment shifted to the St. Paul, Minneapolis and Manitoba Railway (SPM&M) in 1881, where he started as assistant general manager.  He was promoted through a series of management positions there to become the general manager himself.

In 1889 he left the SPM&M to succeed William Barstow Strong as president of the Atchison, Topeka and Santa Fe Railway, a position he held until 1893.  Manvel was succeeded by Joseph Reinhart.

Legacy 
Like other Santa Fe presidents, Manvel's name was adopted as the name for a town in the American West.  The town of Manvel, Texas, was named in his honor.

References 
 
 

1837 births
1893 deaths
Atchison, Topeka and Santa Fe Railway presidents
People from Alexander, New York
19th-century American businesspeople